Anaua was a town of ancient Phrygia, later also known as Sanaos. It was located near a salt lake by the same name, now Lake Acıgöl. The town is located near modern Sarıkavak.

References

Populated places of the Byzantine Empire
Populated places in Phrygia
Roman towns and cities in Turkey
History of Afyonkarahisar Province
Dazkırı District